Jia Gaojian (born May 1959) is the current director of the Central Compilation and Translation Bureau, an organ under the Central Committee of the Chinese Communist Party, a position in which he has served since January 2013. Jia is the superintendent of the Central Party School of the Chinese Communist Party and a professor and doctoral advisor at the same institution. He is also the vice president of the China Historical Materialism Society. Gao's primary research areas include Marxist philosophy and social philosophy.

References

1959 births
Living people